Joseph Kanuku is a retired Anglican bishop in Kenya: he was Bishop of Machakos then Makueni until 2013.

References

21st-century Anglican bishops of the Anglican Church of Kenya
Anglican bishops of Machakos
Anglican bishops of Makueni
Living people
Year of birth missing (living people)